is a Japanese actor and narrator. He is well known for his role as Denka in Taiyō ni Hoero!. He made his television debut in 1969 with Panto Akogare.

In 2015, Onodera won the award for best supporting actor of Tokyo Sports Film Award for Ryuzo and the Seven Henchmen.

Selected filmography

Films226/Four Days of Snow and Blood (1989)It's a Summer Vacation Everyday (1994)Gamera: Guardian of the Universe (1995)Tsuribaka Nisshiseries Aibō the Movie (2008)Amalfi: Rewards of the Goddess (2009)Ryuzo and the Seven Henchmen (2015)

TelevisionTaiyō ni Hoero! (1972-1980) as Shima KimiyukiŌgon no Hibi (1978) as Konishi YukinagaOretachi wa Tenshi da! (1979) as Lawer FujinamiOn'yado Kawasemi (1980–83) Hissatsu Shikirinin  (1984) as ShinkichiAoi  (2000) as Kyōgoku TakatsuguThe Grand Family '' (2021) as Tabuchi

References

External links

 Akira Onodera Kinenote
 Akira Onodera NHK

Japanese male actors
1943 births
Living people